Liège–Bastogne–Liège Femmes is the women's event of Liège–Bastogne–Liège, an annual road bicycle racing event in Wallonia, Belgium, held in late April. The inaugural race, won by Olympic champion Anna van der Breggen, was run on 23 April 2017.

With the reboot of the Amstel Gold Race for Women and the creation of a women's Liège–Bastogne–Liège in 2017, the women's season has the same trio of Ardennes classics as the men's. Both races are held on Sundays mid-April, in addition to La Flèche Wallonne Féminine, which has been on the women's calendar since 1998.

Route

The race is approximately half the distance of the men's event - around 130 to 140 kilometres - starting in Bastogne, from where it heads north to finish in Liège.  

The route has generally used the same route as the men's race into Liège - using climbs such as Côte de La Redoute, Côte des Forges and Côte de la Roche aux Faucons. Since 2019, the race has finished in Liège, and therefore Côte de Saint-Nicolas has been omitted.

Winners

Wins per country

References

External links

UCI Women's World Tour races
Recurring sporting events established in 2017
Cycle races in Belgium
2017 establishments in Belgium